Nickel(II) chloride (or just nickel chloride) is the chemical compound NiCl2. The anhydrous salt is yellow, but the more familiar hydrate NiCl2·6H2O is green. Nickel(II) chloride, in various forms, is the most important source of nickel for chemical synthesis.  The nickel chlorides are deliquescent, absorbing moisture from the air to form a solution.  Nickel salts have been shown to be carcinogenic to the lungs and nasal passages in cases of long-term inhalation exposure.

Production and syntheses
The largest scale production of nickel chloride involves the extraction with hydrochloric acid of nickel matte and residues obtained from roasting refining nickel-containing ores.

Nickel chloride is not usually prepared in the laboratory because it is inexpensive and has a long shelf-life.  The yellowish dihydrate, NiCl22H2O, is produced by heating the hexahydrate between 66 and 133 °C.   The hydrates convert to the anhydrous form upon heating in thionyl chloride or by heating under a stream of HCl gas.  Simply heating the hydrates does not afford the anhydrous dichloride.
NiCl2.6H2O + 6 SOCl2 -> NiCl2 + 6SO2 + 12HCl

The dehydration is accompanied by a color change from green to yellow.

In case one needs a pure compound without presence of cobalt, nickel chloride can be obtained cautiously heating hexaamminenickel chloride:
\overset{hexammine\atop nickel~chloride}{[Ni(NH3)6]Cl2} ->[175-200^\circ\ce{C}] NiCl2{} + 6NH3

Structure of NiCl2 and its hydrates
NiCl2 adopts the CdCl2 structure.  In this motif, each Ni2+ center is coordinated to six Cl− centers, and each chloride is bonded to three Ni(II) centers.  In NiCl2 the Ni-Cl bonds have "ionic character".   Yellow NiBr2 and  black NiI2 adopt similar structures, but with a different packing of the halides, adopting the CdI2 motif.

In contrast, NiCl2·6H2O consists of separated trans-[NiCl2(H2O)4] molecules linked more weakly to adjacent water molecules.  Only four of the six water molecules in the formula is bound to the nickel, and the remaining two are water of crystallization. Cobalt(II) chloride hexahydrate has a similar structure.  The hexahydrate occurs in nature as the very rare mineral nickelbischofite.

The dihydrate NiCl2·2H2O adopts a structure intermediate between the hexahydrate and the anhydrous forms.  It consists of infinite chains of NiCl2, wherein both chloride centers are bridging ligands. The trans sites on the octahedral centers occupied by aquo ligands.  A tetrahydrate NiCl2·4H2O is also known.

Reactions
Nickel(II) chloride solutions are acidic, with a pH of around 4 due to the hydrolysis of the Ni2+ ion.

Coordination complexes

Most of the reactions ascribed to "nickel chloride" involve the hexahydrate, although specialized reactions require the anhydrous form.

Reactions starting from NiCl2·6H2O can be used to form a variety of nickel coordination complexes because the H2O ligands are rapidly displaced by ammonia, amines, thioethers, thiolates, and organophosphines.  In some derivatives, the chloride remains within the coordination sphere, whereas chloride is displaced with highly basic ligands.  Illustrative complexes include:

Some nickel chloride complexes exist as an equilibrium mixture of two geometries; these examples are some of the most dramatic illustrations of structural isomerism for a given coordination number.  For example, NiCl2(PPh3)2, containing four-coordinate Ni(II), exists in solution as a mixture of both the diamagnetic square planar and the paramagnetic tetrahedral isomers.  Square planar complexes of nickel can often form five-coordinate adducts.

NiCl2 is the precursor to acetylacetonate complexes Ni(acac)2(H2O)2 and the benzene-soluble (Ni(acac)2)3, which is a precursor to Ni(1,5-cyclooctadiene)2, an important reagent in organonickel chemistry.

In the presence of water scavengers, hydrated nickel(II) chloride reacts with dimethoxyethane (dme) to form the molecular complex NiCl2(dme)2.  The dme ligands in this complex are labile.  For example, this complex reacts with sodium cyclopentadienide to give the sandwich compound nickelocene.

Hexammine nickel chloride complex is soluble when respective cobalt complex is not, which allows for easy separating of these close-related metals in laboratory conditions.

Applications in organic synthesis
NiCl2 and its hydrate are occasionally useful in organic synthesis.
As a mild Lewis acid, e.g. for the regioselective isomerization of dienols:

In combination with CrCl2 for the coupling of an aldehyde and a vinylic iodide to give allylic alcohols.
For selective reductions in the presence of LiAlH4, e.g. for the conversion of alkenes to alkanes.
As a precursor to Brown's P-1 and P-2 nickel boride catalyst through reaction with NaBH4.
As a precursor to finely divided Ni by reduction with Zn, for the reduction of aldehydes, alkenes, and nitro aromatic compounds.  This reagent also promotes homo-coupling reactions, that is 2RX → R-R where R = aryl, vinyl.
As a catalyst for making dialkyl arylphosphonates from phosphites and aryl iodide, ArI:
ArI + P(OEt)3 → ArP(O)(OEt)2 + EtI

NiCl2-dme (or NiCl2-glyme) is used due to its increased solubility in comparison to the hexahydrate.

Other uses
Nickel chloride solutions are used for electroplating nickel onto other metal items.

Safety
Nickel(II) chloride is irritating upon ingestion, inhalation, skin contact, and eye contact. Prolonged inhalation exposure to nickel and its compounds has been linked to increased cancer risk to the lungs and nasal passages.

References

External links

NIOSH Pocket Guide to Chemical Hazards

Nickel compounds
Chlorides
Metal halides
IARC Group 1 carcinogens
Coordination complexes